Carn an Fhidhleir (994 m) is a mountain in the Grampian Mountains of Scotland. It lies on the border of Inverness-shire, Perthshire and Aberdeenshire, in one of the most remote areas of Scotland between the Cairngorms and the Mounth.

A domed mountain, it lies at the heart of a vast roadless area. It is possible to reach the peak from Glen Tilt or via the Linn of Dee by mountain bike.

References

Mountains and hills of Perth and Kinross
Mountains and hills of Highland (council area)
Marilyns of Scotland
Munros